Irina Antonia Duţă (born 8 October 2004) is a Romanian artistic gymnast. She was a member of the Romanian teams who competed at the inaugural Junior World Championships and who won silver at the 2020 European Championships.

Junior career

2017 
In 2017, Duță had her junior elite debut, competing at the 2017 Romanian Junior Championships where she won a bronze medal for her level (Junior II Level 4) with an AA (all-around) score of 51.130. She also won the gold medal for her uneven bars routine.

2018 
In April 2018, Duță competed in Jesolo, Italy at the 2018 City of Jesolo Trophy, placing 6th with the team (Iulia Berar, Silviana Sfiringu, Ana Maria Puiu). In July, Duță won the gold for her beam and led the team to victory at the Izvorani Friendly where she was also the 2nd best AA.
She then had her biggest competition so far in Glasgow, Scotland at the 2018 European Championships with teammates Ioana Stănciulescu, Daniela Trică, Silviana Sfiringu and Ana Maria Puiu. They finished 4th as a team. Duță also made the floor final with a score of 13.266, and in the final she placed 4th with a 12.9.
In October she competed at the national competition at the age of 14, where she won the floor silver medal. Duță finished her 2018 at the 2018 Top Gym Tournament where she won floor.

2019 
2019 was the last junior year for Duță. Her first competition was the 2019 FIT Challenge in Ghent, Belgium where she won gold with the junior team and silver with the seniors led by Denisa Golgotă.
At the 2019 Romanian Junior Championships, Duță did not compete the AA due to injury but still had the 3rd best score on the uneven bars.
In June at the 2019 Junior World Championships in Győr, Hungary, Duță and her team (Ioana Stănciulescu and Silviana Sfiringu) finished 4th despite having a total of 6 falls.
At the 2019 European Youth Summer Olympic Festival she won team silver along with Silviana Sfiringu and Ioana Stanciulescu. Duță was out of the floor final due to the 2-per-country rule.
At the 2019 Romanian Championships (September 6 through September 8) in Ploiești, Romania, Duță finished 5th in the All Around with a score of 51.400. In this meet she was also able to win the uneven bars bronze medal with Silviana Sfiringu taking the gold and Ioana Stanciulescu the silver.

Competitive history

References 

2004 births
Living people
Romanian female artistic gymnasts
Gymnasts from Bucharest
21st-century Romanian women